is a city located in Kagawa Prefecture, Japan. , the city had an estimated population of 57,921 in 25510 households and a population density of 490 persons per km².

Geography
Kan'onji is located at the western end of Kagawa Prefecture. It faces the Seto Inland Sea to the west and borders Tokushima Prefecture across the Sanuki Mountains to the south. The city includes Ibuki island in the Seto Inland Sea between Shikoku and Honshu. Some coastal parts of the city are within the borders of the Setonaikai National Park.

Neighbouring municipalities 
Kagawa Prefecture
Mitoyo
Tokushima Prefecture
Miyoshi
Ehime Prefecture
 Shikokuchūō

Climate
Kan'onji has a Humid subtropical climate (Köppen Cfa) characterized by warm summers and cool winters with light snowfall.  The average annual temperature in Kan'onji is 15.5 °C. The average annual rainfall is 1439 mm with September as the wettest month. The temperatures are highest on average in January, at around 26.6 °C, and lowest in January, at around 4.9 °C.

Demographics
Per Japanese census data, the population of Kan'onji has been relatively steady since the 1960s.

History 
The area of Kan'onji was part of ancient Sanuki Province and has been inhabited since prehistoric times. A number of burial mounds from the Kofun period have been identified, including the Ōnohara Kofun cluster. Historical documents indicate that the Shinto shrine Kotohiki Hachiman-gū was founded in 703 and that the Buddhist temple of Kannon-ji (from which the city derives its name) was founded by the Kūkai in 803. During the Edo Period, the city area was part of the holdings of Marugame Domain under the Tokugawa shogunate. Following the Meiji restoration, the village of Kan'onji was established within Toyota District with the creation of the modern municipalities system on December 16,1878. It was elevated to town status on February 15, 1890. In 1899, Toyota district was merged with Mino District to form Mitoyo District, Kagawa. Kan'onji was elevated to city status on January 1, 1955.  On October 11, 2005, the towns of Ōnohara and Toyohama (both from Mitoyo District) merged with Kan'onji.

Government
Kan'onji has a mayor-council form of government with a directly elected mayor and a unicameral city council of 22 members. Kan'onji contributes three members to the Kagawa Prefectural Assembly. In terms of national politics, the town is part of Kagawa 3rd district  of the lower house of the Diet of Japan.

Economy
The economy of Kan'onji is primarily food-related, with the city being the largest producer of lettuce in Japan. Commercial fishing, especially for sardines, and food-processing, notably the frozen food industry, is also prominent.

Education
Kan'onji has ten public elementary schools and five public middle schools operated by the city government, and one private middle school.  The city has two public high schools operated by the Kagawa Prefectural Board of Education.The prefecture also operates one special education school for the handicapped.

Transportation

Railways 
 Shikoku Railway Company - Yosan Line
  -  -

Highways 
  Takamatsu Expressway

Sister city relations
 - Appleton, Wisconsin, United States, since January 27,1988 
 - Jimo District, Qingdao, Shandong, China, friendship city since July 27,2000.

Local attractions
Jinne-in, 68th temple on the Shikoku Pilgrimage
Kannon-ji, 69th temple on the Shikoku Pilgrimage
Kotohiki Hachiman-gū
Ōnohara Kofun cluster, National Historic Site
Kotohiki Park, which is part of the Setonaikai National Park,  includes a coin-shaped sand drawing, the Zenigata Sunae, which models the Kan'ei Tsūhō.

Noted people from Kan'onji
Masayoshi Ōhira, Prime Minister of Japan
Yoshinori Ohno, politician, former Minister of Defense

External links

 Kan-onji City official website 
 A tourist's report of Kan-onji

References

Cities in Kagawa Prefecture
Populated coastal places in Japan
Kan'onji, Kagawa